2640 may refer to:

2640 (album), by Francesca Michielin (2018)
2640, a year in the 27th century